John Thomas Kane (born September 6, 1936) is a Canadian former professional hockey center who played 820 games in the Eastern Hockey League for the Clinton Comets. He was inducted into the Greater Utica Sports Hall of Fame in 1997.

References

External links
 

1936 births
Living people
Ice hockey people from Toronto
Canadian ice hockey centres
Clinton Comets players
Canadian expatriate ice hockey players in the United States